In geometry, Heron's formula (or Hero's formula) gives the area of a triangle in terms of the three side lengths , , . If  is the semiperimeter of the triangle, the area  is,

It is named after first-century engineer Heron of Alexandria (or Hero) who proved it in his work Metrica, though it was probably known centuries earlier.

Example

This triangle’s semiperimeter is

and so the area is

In this example, the side lengths and area are integers, making it a Heronian triangle. However, Heron's formula works equally well in cases where one or more of the side lengths are not integers.

Alternate expressions 

Heron's formula can also be written in terms of just the side lengths instead of using the semiperimeter, in several ways,

The same relation can be expressed using the Cayley–Menger determinant,

History 

The formula is credited to Heron (or Hero) of Alexandria ( 60 AD), and a proof can be found in his book Metrica. Mathematical historian Thomas Heath suggested that Archimedes knew the formula over two centuries earlier, and since Metrica is a collection of the mathematical knowledge available in the ancient world, it is possible that the formula predates the reference given in that work.

A formula equivalent to Heron's, namely,

 

was discovered by the Chinese. It was published in Mathematical Treatise in Nine Sections (Qin Jiushao, 1247).

Proofs 
There are many ways to prove Heron's formula, for example using trigonometry as below, or the incenter and one excircle of the triangle, or as a special case of De Gua's theorem (for the particular case of acute triangles), or as a special case of Brahmagupta's formula (for the case of a degenerate cyclic quadrilateral).

Trigonometric proof using the law of cosines
A modern proof, which uses algebra and is quite different from the one provided by Heron, follows.
Applying the law of cosines we get

From this proof, we get the algebraic statement that

The altitude of the triangle on base  has length , and it follows

Algebraic proof using the Pythagorean theorem

The following proof is very similar to one given by Raifaizen.
By the Pythagorean theorem we have  and  according to the figure at the right. Subtracting these yields . This equation allows us to express  in terms of the sides of the triangle:
 
For the height of the triangle we have that . By replacing  with the formula given above and applying the difference of squares identity we get

We now apply this result to the formula that calculates the area of a triangle from its height:

Trigonometric proof using the law of cotangents

Their combined area is

where  is the semiperimeter.

 

The middle step above is  the triple cotangent identity, which applies because the sum of half-angles is 

Combining the two, we get
 
from which the result follows.

Numerical stability 
Heron's formula as given above is numerically unstable for triangles with a very small angle when using floating-point arithmetic. A stable alternative involves arranging the lengths of the sides so that  and computing
 
The brackets in the above formula are required in order to prevent numerical instability in the evaluation.

Similar triangle-area formulae 

Three other formulae for the area of a general triangle have a similar structure as Heron's formula, expressed in terms of different variables.

where  is the diameter of the circumcircle,  This last formula coincides with the standard Heron formula when the circumcircle has unit diameter.

Generalizations 
Heron's formula is a special case of Brahmagupta's formula for the area of a cyclic quadrilateral. Heron's formula and Brahmagupta's formula are both special cases of Bretschneider's formula for the area of a quadrilateral. Heron's formula can be obtained from Brahmagupta's formula or Bretschneider's formula by setting one of the sides of the quadrilateral to zero.

 

where , the semiperimeter, is defined to be

 
Heron's formula is also a special case of the formula for the area of a trapezoid or trapezium based only on its sides. Heron's formula is obtained by setting the smaller parallel side to zero.

Expressing Heron's formula with a Cayley–Menger determinant in terms of the squares of the distances between the three given vertices,

illustrates its similarity to Tartaglia's formula for the volume of a three-simplex.

Another generalization of Heron's formula to pentagons and hexagons inscribed in a circle was discovered by David P. Robbins.

Heron-type formula for the volume of a tetrahedron 

where

Heron formulae in non-Euclidean geometries
There are also formulae for the area of a triangle in terms of its side lengths for triangles in the sphere or the hyperbolic plane. 
For a triangle in the sphere with side lengths , half perimeter  and area  such a formula is 

while for the hyperbolic plane we have

See also
 Shoelace formula

References

External links 
 A Proof of the Pythagorean Theorem From Heron's Formula at cut-the-knot
 Interactive applet and area calculator using Heron's Formula
 J. H. Conway discussion on Heron's Formula
 
 A Geometric Proof of Heron's Formula
 An alternative proof of Heron's Formula without words
 Factoring Heron

Theorems about triangles
Articles containing proofs
Area